Tea is an aromatic beverage prepared by pouring hot or boiling water over cured or fresh leaves of Camellia sinensis, an evergreen shrub native to East Asia which probably originated in the borderlands of southwestern China and northern Myanmar. Tea is also rarely made from the leaves of Camellia taliensis. After plain water, tea is the most widely consumed drink in the world. There are many different types of tea; some have a cooling, slightly bitter, and astringent flavour, while others have vastly different profiles that include sweet, nutty, floral, or grassy notes. Tea has a stimulating effect in humans primarily due to its caffeine content.

An early credible record of tea drinking dates to the third century AD, in a medical text written by Chinese physician Hua Tuo. It was popularised as a recreational drink during the Chinese Tang dynasty, and tea drinking subsequently spread to other East Asian countries. Portuguese priests and merchants introduced it to Europe during the 16th century. During the 17th century, drinking tea became fashionable among the English, who started to plant tea on a large scale in British India.

The term herbal tea refers to drinks not made from Camellia sinensis. They are the infusions of fruit, leaves, or other plant parts, such as steeps of rosehip, chamomile, or rooibos. These may be called tisanes or herbal infusions to prevent confusion with tea made from the tea plant.

Etymology 
The etymology of the various words for tea reflects the history of transmission of tea drinking culture and trade from China to countries around the world. Nearly all of the words for tea worldwide fall into three broad groups: te, cha and chai, present in English as tea, cha or char, and chai.  The earliest of the three to enter English is cha, which came in the 1590s via the Portuguese, who traded in Macao and picked up the Cantonese pronunciation of the word. The more common tea form arrived in the 17th century via the Dutch, who acquired it either indirectly from the Malay teh, or directly from the tê pronunciation in Min Chinese. The third form chai (meaning "spiced tea") originated from a northern Chinese pronunciation of cha, which travelled overland to Central Asia and Persia where it picked up a Persian ending yi.

Origin and history

Botanical origin

Tea plants are native to East Asia and the probable center of origin of tea is near the source of the Irrawaddy River from where it spread out fan-wise into southeast China, Indo-China and Assam. Thus, the natural home of the tea plant is considered to be within the comparatively small fan-shaped area between Nagaland, Manipur and Mizoram along the Burma frontier in the west, through China as far as the Chekiang Province in the east, and from this line generally south through the hills to Burma and Thailand to Vietnam. The west–east axis indicated above is about 2400 km long extending from longitude 95°-120°E. The north–south axis covers about 1920 km, starting from the northern part of Burma, latitude 29°N passing through Yunnan, Tongkin, Thailand, Laos and on to Annan, reaching latitude 11°N.

Chinese (small-leaf) type tea (C. sinensis var. sinensis) may have originated in southern China possibly with hybridization of unknown wild tea relatives. However, since there are no known wild populations of this tea, its origin is speculative.

Given their genetic differences forming distinct clades, Chinese Assam-type tea (C. sinensis var. assamica) may have two different parentages – one being found in southern Yunnan (Xishuangbanna, Pu'er City) and the other in western Yunnan (Lincang, Baoshan). Many types of Southern Yunnan Assam tea have been hybridized with the closely related species Camellia taliensis. Unlike Southern Yunnan Assam tea, Western Yunnan Assam tea shares many genetic similarities with Indian Assam-type tea (also C. sinensis var. assamica). Thus, Western Yunnan Assam tea and Indian Assam tea both may have originated from the same parent plant in the area where southwestern China, Indo-Burma, and Tibet meet. However, as the Indian Assam tea shares no haplotypes with Western Yunnan Assam tea, Indian Assam tea is likely to have originated from an independent domestication. Some Indian Assam tea appears to have hybridized with the species Camellia pubicosta.

Assuming a generation of 12 years, Chinese small-leaf tea is estimated to have diverged from Assam tea around 22,000 years ago, while Chinese Assam tea and Indian Assam tea diverged 2,800 years ago. The divergence of Chinese small-leaf tea and Assam tea would correspond to the last glacial maximum.

Early tea drinking

People in ancient East Asia ate tea for centuries, perhaps even millennia, before ever consuming it as a beverage. They would nibble on the leaves raw, add them to soups or greens, or ferment them and chew it like how betel is chewed.

Tea drinking may have begun in the region of Yunnan, where it was used for medicinal purposes. It is also believed that in Sichuan, "people began to boil tea leaves for consumption into a concentrated liquid without the addition of other leaves or herbs, thereby using tea as a bitter yet stimulating drink, rather than as a medicinal concoction."

Chinese legends attribute the invention of tea to the mythical Shennong (in central and northern China) in 2737 BC, although evidence suggests that tea drinking may have been introduced from the southwest of China (Sichuan/Yunnan area). The earliest written records of tea come from China. The word tú  appears in the Shijing and other ancient texts to signify a kind of "bitter vegetable", and it is possible that it referred to many different plants such as sow thistle, chicory, or smartweed, as well as tea. In the Chronicles of Huayang, it was recorded that the Ba people in Sichuan presented tu to the Zhou king. The Qin later conquered the state of Ba and its neighbour Shu, and according to the 17th century scholar Gu Yanwu who wrote in Ri Zhi Lu: "It was after the Qin had taken Shu that they learned how to drink tea." Another possible early reference to tea is found in a letter written by the Qin dynasty general Liu Kun who requested that some "real tea" to be sent to him.

The earliest known physical evidence of tea was discovered in 2016 in the mausoleum of Emperor Jing of Han in Xi'an, indicating that tea from the genus Camellia was drunk by Han dynasty emperors as early as the second century BC. The Han dynasty work, "The Contract for a Youth", written by Wang Bao in 59 BC, contains the first known reference to boiling tea. Among the tasks listed to be undertaken by the youth, the contract states that "he shall boil tea and fill the utensils" and "he shall buy tea at Wuyang". The first record of tea cultivation is also dated to this period, during which tea was cultivated on Meng Mountain near Chengdu. Another early credible record of tea drinking dates to the 3rd century AD, in a medical text by Hua Tuo, who stated, "to drink bitter t'u constantly makes one think better." However, before the Tang dynasty, tea-drinking was primarily a southern Chinese (Southern dynasties) practice centered in Jiankang. Tea was disdained by the Northern dynasties aristocrats, who describe it as inferior to yogurt. It became widely popular during the Tang dynasty, when it was spread to Korea, Japan, and Vietnam. The Classic of Tea, a treatise on tea and its preparations, was written by the 8th century Chinese writer, Lu Yu. He was known to have influenced tea drinking on a large part in China.

Developments

Through the centuries, a variety of techniques for processing tea, and a number of different forms of tea, were developed. During the Tang dynasty, tea was steamed, then pounded and shaped into cake form, while in the Song dynasty, loose-leaf tea was developed and became popular. During the Yuan and Ming dynasties, unoxidized tea leaves were first stirred in a hot dry pan, then rolled and air-dried, a process that stops the oxidation process that would have turned the leaves dark, thereby allowing tea to remain green. In the 15th century, oolong tea, in which the leaves are allowed to partially oxidize before being heated in the pan, was developed. Western tastes, however, favoured the fully oxidized black tea, and the leaves were allowed to oxidize further. Yellow tea was an accidental discovery in the production of green tea during the Ming dynasty, when apparently careless practices allowed the leaves to turn yellow, which yielded a different flavour.

Worldwide spread

Tea was first introduced to Western priests and merchants in China during the 16th century, at which time it was termed chá. The earliest European reference to tea, written as chiai, came from Delle navigationi e viaggi written by Venetian Giambattista Ramusio in 1545. The first recorded shipment of tea by a European nation was in 1607 when the Dutch East India Company moved a cargo of tea from Macao to Java, then two years later, the Dutch bought the first assignment of tea which was from Hirado in Japan to be shipped to Europe. Tea became a fashionable drink in The Hague in the Netherlands, and the Dutch introduced the drink to Germany, France, and across the Atlantic to New Amsterdam (New York).

In 1567, Russian people came in contact with tea when the Cossack Atamans Petrov and Yalyshev visited China. The Mongolian Khan donated to Tsar Michael I four poods (65–70 kg) of tea in 1638. According to Jeremiah Curtin, it was possibly in 1636 that Vassili Starkov was sent as envoy to the Altyn Khan. He was given 250 pounds of tea as a gift to the tsar. Starkov at first refused, seeing no use for a load of dead leaves, but the Khan insisted. Thus was tea introduced to Russia. In 1679, Russia concluded a treaty on regular tea supplies from China via camel caravan in exchange for furs. It is today considered the de facto national beverage.

The first record of tea in English came from a letter written by Richard Wickham, who ran an East India Company office in Japan, writing to a merchant in Macao requesting "the best sort of chaw" in 1615. Peter Mundy, a traveller and merchant who came across tea in Fujian in 1637, wrote, "chaa – only water with a kind of herb boyled in it". Tea was sold in a coffee house in London in 1657, Samuel Pepys tasted tea in 1660, and Catherine of Braganza took the tea-drinking habit to the English court when she married Charles II in 1662. Tea, however, was not widely consumed in the British Isles until the 18th century and remained expensive until the latter part of that period. English drinkers preferred to add sugar and milk to black tea, and black tea overtook green tea in popularity in the 1720s. Tea smuggling during the 18th century led to the general public being able to afford and consume tea. The British government removed the tax on tea, thereby eliminating the smuggling trade, by 1785. In Britain and Ireland, tea was initially consumed as a luxury item on special occasions, such as religious festivals, wakes, and domestic work gatherings. The price of tea in Europe fell steadily during the 19th century, especially after Indian tea began to arrive in large quantities; by the late 19th century tea had become an everyday beverage for all levels of society. The popularity of tea played a role in historical events – the Tea Act of 1773 provoked the Boston Tea Party that escalated into the American Revolution. The need to address the issue of British trade deficit because of the trade in tea resulted in the Opium Wars. The Qing Kangxi Emperor had banned foreign products from being sold in China, decreeing in 1685 that all goods bought from China must be paid for in silver coin or bullion. Traders from other nations then sought to find another product, in this case opium, to sell to China to earn back the silver they were required to pay for tea and other commodities. The subsequent attempts by the Chinese Government to curtail the trade in opium led to war.

Chinese small-leaf-type tea was introduced into India in 1836 by the British in an attempt to break the Chinese monopoly on tea. In 1841, Archibald Campbell brought seeds of Chinese tea from the Kumaun region and experimented with planting tea in Darjeeling. The Alubari tea garden was opened in 1856, and Darjeeling tea began to be produced. In 1848, Robert Fortune was sent by the Honourable East India Company on a mission to China to bring the tea plant back to Great Britain. He began his journey in high secrecy as his mission occurred in the lull between the First Opium War and the Second Opium War. The Chinese tea plants he brought back were introduced to the Himalayas, though most did not survive. The British had discovered that a different variety of tea was endemic to Assam and the northeast region of India, which was then hybridized with Chinese small-leaf-type tea. Using Chinese planting and cultivation techniques, the British colonial government established a tea industry by offering land in Assam to any European who agreed to cultivate it for export. Tea was originally consumed only by Anglo-Indians; however, it became widely popular in India in the 1950s because of a successful advertising campaign by the India Tea Board. The British introduced tea industry to Sri Lanka (then Ceylon) in 1867.

Chemical composition 

Physically speaking, tea has properties of both a solution and a suspension. It is a solution of all the water-soluble compounds that have been extracted from the tea leaves, such as the polyphenols and amino acids, but is a suspension when all of the insoluble components are considered, such as the cellulose in the tea leaves. Tea infusions are among most consumed beverages globally.

Caffeine constitutes about 3% of tea's dry weight, translating to between 30 and 90 milligrams per  cup depending on the type, brand, and brewing method. A study found that the caffeine content of one gram of black tea ranged from 22 to 28 mg, while the caffeine content of one gram of green tea ranged from 11 to 20 mg, reflecting a significant difference. Tea also contains small amounts of theobromine and theophylline, which are stimulants, and xanthines similar to caffeine.

The astringency in tea can be attributed to the presence of polyphenols. These are the most abundant compounds in tea leaves, making up 30–40% of their composition. Polyphenols include flavonoids, epigallocatechin gallate (EGCG), and other catechins. Although there has been preliminary clinical research on whether green or black teas may protect against various human diseases, there is no evidence that tea polyphenols have any effect on health or lowering disease risk.

Health effects 

Although health benefits have been assumed throughout the history of Camellia sinensis's consumption, there is no high-quality evidence showing that tea consumption gives significant benefits other than possibly increasing alertness, an effect caused by caffeine in the tea leaves. In clinical research conducted in the early 21st century, it was found there is no scientific evidence to indicate that consuming tea affects any disease or improves health.

Black and green teas contain no essential nutrients in significant amounts, with the exception of the dietary mineral manganese, at 0.5 mg per cup or 26% of the Reference Daily Intake (RDI). Fluoride is sometimes present in tea; certain types of "brick tea", made from old leaves and stems, have the highest levels, enough to pose a health risk if much tea is drunk, which has been attributed to high levels of fluoride in soils, acidic soils, and long brewing.

Cultivation and harvesting 

Camellia sinensis is an evergreen plant that grows mainly in tropical and subtropical climates. Some varieties can also tolerate marine climates and are cultivated as far north as Cornwall in England, Perthshire in Scotland, Washington in the United States, and Vancouver Island in Canada. In the Southern Hemisphere, tea is grown as far south as Hobart in Tasmania and Waikato in New Zealand.

Tea plants are propagated from seed and cuttings; about 4 to 12 years are needed for a plant to bear seed and about three years before a new plant is ready for harvesting. In addition to a zone 8 climate or warmer, tea plants require at least 127 cm (50 in) of rainfall per year and prefer acidic soils. Though at these heights the plants grow more slowly, they acquire a better flavour.

Two principal varieties are used: Camellia sinensis var. sinensis, which is used for most Chinese, Formosan and Japanese teas, and C. sinensis var. assamica, used in Pu-erh and most Indian teas (but not Darjeeling). Within these botanical varieties, many strains and modern clonal varieties are known. Leaf size is the chief criterion for the classification of tea plants, with three primary classifications being: Assam type, characterised by the largest leaves; China type, characterised by the smallest leaves; and Cambodian type, characterised by leaves of intermediate size. The Cambodian-type tea (C. assamica subsp. lasiocaly) was originally considered a type of Assam tea. However, later genetic work showed that it is a hybrid between Chinese small-leaf tea and Assam-type tea. Darjeeling tea also appears to be a hybrid between Chinese small-leaf tea and Assam-type large-leaf tea.

A tea plant will grow into a tree of up to  if left undisturbed, but cultivated plants are generally pruned to waist height for ease of plucking. Also, the short plants bear more new shoots which provide new and tender leaves and increase the quality of the tea. Only the top  of the mature plant are picked. These buds and leaves are called 'flushes'. A plant will grow a new flush every 7 to 15 days during the growing season. Leaves that are slow in development tend to produce better-flavoured teas. Several teas are available from specified flushes; for example, Darjeeling tea is available as first flush (at a premium price), second flush, monsoon and autumn. Assam second flush or "tippy" tea is considered superior to first flush, because of the gold tips that appear on the leaves.

Pests that can afflict tea plants include mosquito bugs, genus Helopeltis, which are true bugs and not to be confused with dipterous insects of family Culicidae ('mosquitos'). Mosquito bugs can damage leaves both by sucking plant materials, and by the laying of eggs (oviposition) within the plant. Spraying with synthetic insecticides may be deemed appropriate. Other pests are Lepidopteran leaf feeders and various tea diseases.

Production
Tea is mainly grown in Asia and Africa, though it is also grown in South America and around the Black and Caspian Seas. The four biggest tea-producing countries are China, India, Kenya and Sri Lanka, together representing 75% of world tea production. Smaller hubs of production include such places as São Miguel Island, Azores, in Portugal, and Guria, in Georgia. In 2020, global production of tea was 7.0 million tonnes, led by China with 42% and India with 20% of the world total. Kenya, Argentina, and Sri Lanka were secondary producers.

Storage 
Storage conditions and type determine the shelf life of tea; that of black teas is greater than that of green teas. Some, such as flower teas, may last only a month or so. Others, such as pu-erh, improve with age. To remain fresh and prevent mold, tea needs to be stored away from heat, light, air, and moisture. Tea must be kept at room temperature in an air-tight container. Black tea in a bag within a sealed opaque canister may keep for two years. Green tea deteriorates more rapidly, usually in less than a year. Tightly rolled gunpowder tea leaves keep longer than the more open-leafed Chun Mee tea.

Storage life for all teas can be extended by using desiccant or oxygen-absorbing packets, vacuum sealing, or refrigeration in air-tight containers (except green tea, where discrete use of refrigeration or freezing is recommended and temperature variation kept to a minimum).

Processing and classification 

Tea is generally divided into categories based on how it is processed. At least six different types are produced:
 White: wilted and unoxidized;
 Yellow: unwilted and unoxidized but allowed to yellow;
 Green: unwilted and unoxidized;
 Oolong: wilted, bruised, and partially oxidized;
 Black: wilted, sometimes crushed, and fully oxidized (called  [hóngchá], "red tea" in Chinese and other East Asian tea culture);
 Post-fermented (Dark): green tea that has been allowed to ferment/compost (called Pu'er if from the Yunnan district of South-Western China or  [hēichá] "black tea" in Chinese tea culture).

After picking, the leaves of C. sinensis soon begin to wilt and oxidize unless immediately dried. An enzymatic oxidation process triggered by the plant's intracellular enzymes causes the leaves to turn progressively darker as their chlorophyll breaks down and tannins are released. This darkening is stopped at a predetermined stage by heating, which deactivates the enzymes responsible. In the production of black teas, halting by heating is carried out simultaneously with drying. Without careful moisture and temperature control during manufacture and packaging, growth of undesired molds and bacteria may make tea unfit for consumption.

Additional processing and additives 

After basic processing, teas may be altered through additional processing steps before being sold and is often consumed with additions to the basic tea leaf and water added during preparation or drinking. Examples of additional processing steps that occur before tea is sold are blending, flavouring, scenting, and decaffeination of teas. Examples of additions added at the point of consumption include milk, sugar and lemon.

Tea blending is the combination of different teas together to achieve the final product. Such teas may combine others from the same cultivation area or several different ones. The aim is to obtain consistency, better taste, higher price, or some combination of the three.

Flavoured and scented teas add aromas and flavours to the base tea. This can be accomplished through directly adding flavouring agents, such as ginger, cloves, mint leaves, cardamom, bergamot (found in Earl Grey), vanilla, and spearmint. Alternatively, because tea easily retains odours, it can be placed in proximity to an aromatic ingredient to absorb its aroma, as in traditional jasmine tea.

The addition of milk to tea in Europe was first mentioned in 1680 by the epistolist Madame de Sévigné. Many teas are traditionally drunk with milk in cultures where dairy products are consumed. These include Indian masala chai and British tea blends. These teas tend to be very hearty varieties of black tea which can be tasted through the milk, such as Assams, or the East Friesian blend. Milk is thought to neutralise remaining tannins and reduce acidity. The Han Chinese do not usually drink milk with tea but the Manchus do, and the elite of the Qing Dynasty of the Chinese Empire continued to do so. Hong Kong-style milk tea is based on British habits. Tibetans and other Himalayan peoples traditionally drink tea with milk or yak butter and salt. In Eastern European countries, Russia and Italy, tea is commonly served with lemon juice. In Poland, tea is traditionally served with a slice of lemon and is sweetened with either sugar or honey; tea with milk is called a bawarka ("Bavarian style") in Polish and is also widely popular. In Australia, tea with milk is known as "white tea".

The order of steps in preparing a cup of tea is a much-debated topic and can vary widely between cultures or even individuals. Some say it is preferable to add the milk to the cup before the tea, as the high temperature of freshly brewed tea can denature the proteins found in fresh milk, similar to the change in taste of UHT milk, resulting in an inferior-tasting beverage. Others insist it is better to add the milk to the cup after the tea, as black tea is often brewed as close to boiling as possible. The addition of milk chills the beverage during the crucial brewing phase, if brewing in a cup rather than using a pot, meaning the delicate flavour of a good tea cannot be fully appreciated. By adding the milk afterwards, it is easier to dissolve sugar in the tea and also to ensure the desired amount of milk is added, as the colour of the tea can be observed. Historically, the order of steps was taken as an indication of class: only those wealthy enough to afford good-quality porcelain would be confident of its being able to cope with being exposed to boiling water unadulterated with milk. Higher temperature difference means faster heat transfer, so the earlier milk is added, the slower the drink cools. A 2007 study published in the European Heart Journal found certain beneficial effects of tea may be lost through the addition of milk.

Packaging

Tea bags 

In 1907, American tea merchant Thomas Sullivan began distributing samples of his tea in small bags of silk with a drawstring. Consumers noticed they could simply leave the tea in the bag and reuse it with fresh tea. However, the potential of this distribution and packaging method would not be fully realised until later. During World War II, tea was rationed in the United Kingdom. In 1953, after rationing in the UK ended, Yorkshire-based tea manufacturer Tetley launched the tea bag in the UK, and it was an immediate success.

The "pyramid tea bag" (or sachet), introduced by Lipton and PG Tips/Scottish Blend in 1996, attempts to address one of the connoisseurs' arguments against paper tea bags by way of its three-dimensional tetrahedron shape, which allows more room for tea leaves to expand while steeping. However, some types of pyramid tea bags have been criticised as being environmentally unfriendly, since their synthetic material is not as biodegradable as loose tea leaves and paper tea bags.

Loose tea 

The tea leaves are packaged loosely in a canister, paper bag, or other container such as a tea chest. Some whole teas, such as rolled gunpowder tea leaves, which resist crumbling, are vacuum-packed for freshness in aluminised packaging for storage and retail. The loose tea is individually measured for use, allowing for flexibility and flavour control at the expense of convenience. Strainers, tea balls, tea presses, filtered teapots, and infusion bags prevent loose leaves from floating in the tea and over-brewing. A traditional method uses a three-piece lidded teacup called a gaiwan, the lid of which is tilted to decant the tea into a different cup for consumption.

Compressed tea 

Compressed tea (such as pu-erh) is produced for convenience in transport, storage, and ageing. It can usually be stored longer without spoilage than loose leaf tea. Compressed tea is prepared by loosening leaves from the cake using a small knife, and steeping the extracted pieces in water. During the Tang dynasty, as described by Lu Yu, compressed tea was ground into a powder, combined with hot water, and ladled into bowls, resulting in a "frothy" mixture. In the Song dynasty, the tea powder would instead be whisked with hot water in the bowl. Although no longer practiced in China today, the whisking method of preparing powdered tea was transmitted to Japan by Zen Buddhist monks, and is still used to prepare matcha in the Japanese tea ceremony.

Compressed tea was the most popular form of tea in China during the Tang dynasty. By the beginning of the Ming dynasty, it had been displaced by loose-leaf tea. It remains popular, however, in the Himalayan countries and Mongolian steppes. In Mongolia, tea bricks were ubiquitous enough to be used as a form of currency. Among Himalayan peoples, compressed tea is consumed by combining it with yak butter and salt to produce butter tea.

Instant tea 

"Instant tea", similar to freeze-dried instant coffee and an alternative to brewed tea, can be consumed either hot or cold. Instant tea was developed in the 1930s, with Nestlé introducing the first commercial product in 1946, while Redi-Tea debuted instant iced tea in 1953. Additives such as chai, vanilla, honey or fruit, are popular, as is powdered milk.

During the Second World War British and Canadian soldiers were issued an instant tea known as "compo" in their composite ration packs. These blocks of instant tea, powdered milk, and sugar were not always well received. As Royal Canadian Artillery Gunner, George C Blackburn observed:

Bottled and canned tea 

Canned tea is sold prepared and ready to drink. It was introduced in 1981 in Japan. The first bottled tea was introduced by an Indonesian tea company, PT. Sinar Sosro in 1969 with the brand name Teh Botol Sosro (or Sosro bottled tea). In 1983, Swiss-based Bischofszell Food Ltd. was the first company to bottle iced tea on an industrial scale.

Tea culture 

Tea is the second most consumed beverage on Earth, after water. In many cultures it is consumed at elevated social events, such as the tea party. Tea ceremonies have arisen in different cultures, such as the Chinese and Japanese traditions, each of which employs certain techniques and ritualised protocol of brewing and serving tea for enjoyment in a refined setting. One form of Chinese tea ceremony is the Gongfu tea ceremony, which typically uses small Yixing clay teapots and oolong tea.

In the United Kingdom, 63% of people drink tea daily. It is customary for a host to offer tea to guests soon after their arrival. Tea is consumed both at home and outside the home, often in cafés or tea rooms. Afternoon tea with cakes on fine porcelain is a cultural stereotype. In southwest England, many cafés serve a cream tea, consisting of scones, clotted cream, and jam alongside a pot of tea. In some parts of Britain and India, 'tea' may also refer to the evening meal.

Ireland, as of 2016, was the second-biggest per capita consumer of tea in the world. Local blends are the most popular in Ireland, including Irish breakfast tea, using Rwandan, Kenyan and Assam teas. The annual national average of tea consumption in Ireland is 2.7 kg to 4 kg per person. Tea in Ireland is usually taken with milk or sugar and brewed longer for a stronger taste.

Turkish tea is an important part of that country's cuisine and is the most commonly consumed hot drink, despite the country's long history of coffee consumption. In 2004, Turkey produced 205,500 tonnes of tea (6.4% of the world's total tea production), which made it one of the largest tea markets in the world, with 120,000 tons being consumed in Turkey and the rest being exported. In 2010, Turkey had the highest per capita consumption in the world at 2.7 kg. As of 2013, the per-capita consumption of Turkish tea exceeds 10 cups per day and 13.8 kg per year. Tea is grown mostly in Rize Province on the Black Sea coast.

Russia has a long, rich tea history dating to 1638 when tea was introduced to Tsar Michael. Social gatherings were considered incomplete without tea, which was traditionally brewed in a samovar.

In Pakistan, both black and green teas are popular and are known locally as sabz chai and kahwah, respectively. The popular green tea is often served after every meal in the Pashtun belt of Balochistan and in Khyber Pakhtunkhwa. In central and southern Punjab and the metropolitan Sindh region of Pakistan, tea with milk and sugar (sometimes with pistachios, cardamom, etc.), commonly referred to as chai, is widely consumed. It is the most common beverage of households in the region. In the northern Pakistani regions of Chitral and Gilgit-Baltistan, a salty, buttered Tibetan-style tea is consumed.

Indian tea culture is strong; the drink is the most popular hot beverage in the country. It is consumed daily in almost all houses, offered to guests, consumed in high amounts in domestic and official surroundings, and is made with the addition of milk with or without spices, and usually sweetened. It is sometimes served with biscuits to be dipped in the tea and eaten before consuming the tea. More often than not, it is drunk in "doses" of small cups (referred to as "cutting" chai if sold at street tea vendors) rather than one large cup.

Iranians have one of the highest per-capita rates of tea consumption in the world and a Châikhâne(Tea House) is a common sight on Iranian streets. Due to the suitable climate, tea is usually cultivated in large areas of northern Iran along the shores of the Caspian Sea.

In Burma (Myanmar), tea is consumed not only as hot drinks, but also as sweet tea and green tea known locally as laphet-yay and laphet-yay-gyan, respectively. Pickled tea leaves, known locally as lahpet, are also a national delicacy. Pickled tea is usually eaten with roasted sesame seeds, crispy fried beans, roasted peanuts and fried garlic chips.

In Mali, gunpowder tea is served in series of three, starting with the highest oxidisation or strongest, unsweetened tea, locally referred to as "strong like death", followed by a second serving, where the same tea leaves are boiled again with some sugar added ("pleasant as life"), and a third one, where the same tea leaves are boiled for the third time with yet more sugar added ("sweet as love"). Green tea is the central ingredient of a distinctly Malian custom, the "Grin", an informal social gathering that cuts across social and economic lines, starting in front of family compound gates in the afternoons and extending late into the night, and is widely popular in Bamako and other large urban areas.

In the United States, 80% of tea is consumed as iced tea. Sweet tea is native to the southeastern U.S. and is iconic in its cuisine.

Economics 

Tea is the most popular manufactured drink consumed in the world, equaling all others – including coffee, soft drinks, and alcohol – combined. Most tea consumed outside East Asia is produced on large plantations in the hilly regions of India and Sri Lanka and is destined to be sold to large businesses. Opposite this large-scale industrial production are many small "gardens," sometimes minuscule plantations, that produce highly sought-after teas prized by gourmets. These teas are both rare and expensive and can be compared to some of the most expensive wines in this respect.

Labor and consumer safety problems
Tests of commercially popular teas have detected residues of banned toxic pesticides.

Tea production in Kenya, Malawi, Rwanda, Tanzania, and Uganda has been reported to make use of child labor according to the U.S. Department of Labor's List of Goods Produced by Child Labor or Forced Labor. Workers who pick and pack tea on plantations in developing countries can face harsh working conditions and may earn below the living wage.

Certification
Several bodies independently certify the production of tea, such as Rainforest Alliance, Fairtrade, UTZ Certified, and Organic. From 2008 to 2016, sustainability standards-certified tea production experienced a compound annual growth rate of about 35%, accounting for at least 19% of overall tea production. In 2016, at least 1.15 million tonnes of sustainably certified tea was produced, valued at US$2 billion.

Rainforest Alliance certified tea is sold by Unilever brands Lipton and PG Tips in Western Europe, Australia and the U.S. Fairtrade certified tea is sold by a large number of suppliers around the world. UTZ Certified tea is sold by Pickwick tea.

Production of organic tea has risen since its introduction in 1990 at Rembeng, Kondoli Tea Estate, Assam.  tons of organic tea were sold in 1999.

See also 

 Cannabis tea
 Chifir', Russian extra-strong tea brew
 Herbal tea
 Frederick John Horniman
 Indian Tea Association
 International Tea Day
 ISO 3103
 Kombucha, drink produced from bacteria and yeast grown on tea
 List of Chinese teas
 List of hot beverages
 List of national drinks
 List of tea companies
 Peace Iced Tea
 Phenolic content in tea
 Tea classics, influential historical monographs of East Asian tea
 Tea leaf grading
 Tea strainer
 Tea tasting

References

Citations

General sources 
 
 
 
 

 
Chinese cuisine
Crops originating from China
Herbal and fungal stimulants
Victorian cuisine